Scott Swofford is an American film producer. He is a Latter-day Saint and produces IMAX films as well as other formats. When he was director of media for the LDS Church missionary department he developed the "I'm a Mormon" campaign. He has also worked as creative director for BYU Broadcasting. As such he was one of the main forces behind Granite Flats and director of Extinct.

Filmography
Legacy: A Mormon Journey (1990)
Split Infinity (1992)
The ButterCream Gang in Secret of Treasure Mountain (1993)
Seasons of the Heart (1993)
Rigoletto (1993)
The Great American West (1995)Hearst Castle: Building the Dream (1996)Mysteries of Egypt (1998)Olympic Glory (1999)The Testaments of One Fold and One Shepherd (2000)Shackleton's Antarctic Adventure (2001)The Work and the Glory (2004)The Work and the Glory: American Zion (2005)Granite Flats (2013-2015)Extinct (2017)

Awards and recognition
Best Western Film (Seasons of the Heart''), Santa Clarita International Film Festival

References
New York Times article on Granite Flats

External links
 
 

American film producers
Place of birth missing (living people)
Year of birth missing (living people)
Living people